Her Night Out is a 1932 British comedy film directed by William C. McGann and starring Dorothy Bartlam, Lester Matthews and Joan Marion. It is also known by the alternative title of Alone at Last. It is a quota quickie, made at Teddington Studios by the British subsidiary of the Hollywood studio Warner Brothers.

Synopsis
A married couple accidentally become mixed up with a bank robber.

Cast
 Dorothy Bartlam as Kitty Vickery  
 Lester Matthews as Gerald Vickery  
 Joan Marion as Goldie  
 Jack Raine as Jim Hanley  
 Dodo Watts as Toots

References

Bibliography
 Low, Rachael. Filmmaking in 1930s Britain. George Allen & Unwin, 1985.
 Wood, Linda. British Films, 1927-1939. British Film Institute, 1986.

External links

1932 films
Films directed by William C. McGann
1932 comedy films
British comedy films
Films shot at Teddington Studios
Warner Bros. films
British black-and-white films
1930s English-language films
1930s British films